Cladura flavoferruginea is a species of limoniid crane fly in the family Limoniidae.

References

Further reading

External links

 Diptera.info

Limoniidae
Taxa named by Carl Robert Osten-Sacken